Louan Gideon (November 12, 1955 – February 3, 2014) was an American actress best known for her role as antagonist Danielle Atron on Nickelodeon's The Secret World of Alex Mack. She was also the last actress to play Liza Walton Sentell on the long-running soap opera Search for Tomorrow.

Biography
Born in Erath County, Texas, Gideon was a jazz singer in Europe and Asia before becoming an actress in the US. Gideon earned Bachelor of Arts degree at Baylor University in Waco, Texas (1978); she majored in oral communications (radio-television-film). In her freshman year, she was voted as a "Baylor Beauty" - rare for a freshman.

In 2006, she left Los Angeles for the Blue Ridge Mountains of Asheville, North Carolina, where she continued her career as a writer and stage actress. She successfully battled breast cancer in 2009, and in 2011 married her long-time partner, veteran entertainment executive Walt Borchers. The ceremony took place in Lake Como, Italy, and was presided over by their close friend Bryan Cranston. Her cancer returned in late 2013 and she died surrounded by loved ones on February 3, 2014, at age 58.

Filmography

Film

Television

References

External links

1955 births
2014 deaths
20th-century American actresses
21st-century American actresses
Actresses from Texas
American soap opera actresses
American television actresses
Baylor University alumni
Deaths from breast cancer
Deaths from cancer in North Carolina
People from Erath County, Texas
Singers from Texas